Asgard Peak is a  mountain summit located in the Valhalla Ranges of the Selkirk Mountains in British Columbia, Canada. Asgard Peak is the second-highest point in the Valhalla Ranges, with the highest being Gladsheim Peak,  to the east. The name "Valhalla Mountains" first appeared in George Mercer Dawson's Geological Survey of Canada map published in 1890. Dawson applied names derived from Scandinavian mythology to several of the mountain ranges and peaks in Southern Kootenay. In keeping with the Valhalla theme, this peak's name was submitted February 1970 by Robert Dean of the Kootenay Mountaineering Club for consideration, and it was officially adopted March 3, 1971, by the Geographical Names Board of Canada. Asgard, according to Norse mythology, is the section of Valhalla where the twelve gods dwell. Based on the Köppen climate classification, Asgard Peak has a subarctic climate with cold, snowy winters, and mild summers. This climate supports a small glacier on the peak's north slope. Temperatures can drop below −20 °C with wind chill factors below −30 °C. Precipitation runoff from the mountain drains into tributaries of the Slocan River.

Climbing Routes

Established climbing routes on Asgard Peak:

 East Ridge -  
 West Ridge - 
 Southwest Ridge -  First ascent 1927
 Southeast Ridge - 
 North Ridge - 
 South Face Left - 
 South Face Center - 
 South Face Right -

See also

Geography of British Columbia

References

External links
 Weather forecast: Asgard Peak
 Flickr photo: Asgard's north aspect
 Valhalla Range photo Asgard on right

Two-thousanders of British Columbia
Selkirk Mountains
Kootenay Land District